Moorland Township is a civil township of Muskegon County in the U.S. state of Michigan. The population was 1,616 at the 2000 census.

Geography

Demographics
As of the census of 2000, there were 1,616 people, 539 households, and 438 families residing in the township. There were 561 housing units at an average density of 15.4 per square mile (5.9/km). The racial makeup of the township was 97.15% White, 0.50% African American, 0.19% Native American, 0.80% from other races, and 1.36% from two or more races. Hispanic or Latino of any race were 2.17% of the population.

There were 539 households, out of which 42.7% had children under the age of 18 living with them, 69.4% were married couples living together, 7.1% had a female householder with no husband present, and 18.6% were non-families. 14.5% of all households were made up of individuals, and 7.6% had someone living alone who was 65 years of age or older.  The average household size was 2.98 and the average family size was 3.30.

In the township the population was spread out, with 30.0% under the age of 18, 8.5% from 18 to 24, 31.9% from 25 to 44, 19.9% from 45 to 64, and 9.7% who were 65 years of age or older.  The median age was 34 years. For every 100 females, there were 110.7 males.  For every 100 females age 18 and over, there were 106.4 males.

The median income for a household in the township was $40,669, and the median income for a family was $42,278. Males had a median income of $33,533 versus $23,235 for females. The per capita income for the township was $16,347.  About 6.4% of families and 7.8% of the population were below the poverty line, including 6.4% of those under age 18 and 14.9% of those age 65 or over.

References 

Townships in Muskegon County, Michigan
Townships in Michigan